Amelia Gayle Gorgas (June 1, 1826 – January 3, 1913) was librarian and postmaster of the University of Alabama for 25 years until her retirement at the age of eighty in 1907. She expanded the library from 6,000 to 20,000 volumes. The primary library at the university is named after her.

A native of Greensboro, Alabama, Amelia was the daughter of Alabama governor John Gayle, the wife of Pennsylvania-born Confederate general Josiah Gorgas and the mother of Surgeon General William C. Gorgas. She was inducted into the Alabama Women's Hall of Fame in 1977.

References

External links
 Alabama's Women Hall of Fame
 University of Alabama Gorgas Library
 Josiah and Amelia Gorgas Family papers, University Libraries Division of Special Collections, The University of Alabama

People from Greensboro, Alabama
1826 births
1913 deaths
University of Alabama people
American librarians
American women librarians